BUFF International Film Festival (Swedish: BUFF Filmfestival) is an international children and youth film festival in Malmö, Sweden, held annually in March. It was founded in 1984 and is a member of the European Children’s Film Association (ECFA).

Awards
Each year film awards are given out at the festival:
The City of Malmö Children’s Film Award
The Church of Sweden Award
Young People’s Film Award
ECFA Award
Region Skåne Short Film Award
SVT’s Pitch Award
Children’s Cinema of the Year
Sydsvenskan and BUFF’s Award
SF Bio Children’s Film

References

External links
BUFF International Film Festival - official web page in English

Further reading
  Både galakänsla och övergivna barn - Nöje - Skånskan.se
  BUFF slår upp portarna - Lokaltidningen
  Dags för Buff igen - Lokaltidningen
  BUFF inleder med Kenny – Lokaltidningen
  Åtta filmer tävlar om Svenska kyrkans ungdomsfilmpris - Svenska kyrkan - Om oss
  Blå Malmöfilm på Buff - Nöje - Kristianstadsbladet - Nyheter dygnet runt
  Buff-pris till kortfilmsduo - DN.SE

Children's film festivals
Film festivals in Sweden
Malmö
Tourist attractions in Malmö
Mass media in Malmö
Film festivals established in 1984
Spring (season) events in Sweden
1984 establishments in Sweden